Julie "Finn" Finlay is a fictional character on the CBS crime drama CSI: Crime Scene Investigation, portrayed by Elisabeth Shue. She made her first appearance in the 14th episode of season 12, entitled "Seeing Red", and appeared in every episode during her four seasons as a series regular. She made her final appearance in the season 15 finale, "The End Game", before subsequently appearing in archive footage on  CSI: Cyber "Hack E.R."

Casting
When Marg Helgenberger announced her departure after starring for 12 years as Catherine Willows, producers began to search for a new female lead for CSI. In November 2011, Leaving Las Vegas star Elisabeth Shue joined the series as Julie Finlay. On Shue's casting, executive producer Carol Mendelsohn stated, "while it's difficult to say goodbye to a beloved character like Catherine Willows, it's exciting to start a journey with a new CSI, especially when that character is played by Elisabeth Shue."

Shue made her first on-screen appearance on February 15, 2012, and her final appearance in newly recorded footage on February 15, 2015, in "The End Game". Finn was later referenced in "Immortality", the series finale of CSI: Crime Scene Investigation, while she appears uncredited in archive footage during Cyber second season episode "Hack E.R.".

Personal background
A former Seattle colleague of Director D.B. Russell, Finlay is a blood spatter specialist, or "blood whisperer". Despite being Russell's best friend, he was forced to ask for her resignation after she obtained evidence illegally to incriminate an investor suspected of killing a teenaged girl named Janet Warren. While the suspect was guilty, it did not stop him from suing Finlay, Russell, and the Seattle Police Department. While their friendship was initially strained, they reconciled this when he recruited her as a consultant (and paid her one dollar for her services) in Las Vegas.

Finlay has been married twice, divorcing both husbands. Her second husband, a Seattle Police Detective, and she maintain a friendship, though see each other rarely. She does not share Russell's love of literature, though he loaned her a copy of the book The Thin Man shortly before she was attacked.

Storylines

CSI: Crime Scene Investigation

Season 12 
In "Seeing Red", Russell recruits Finn from a forensic seminar she is teaching, paying her a modest one dollar consultation fee for her work with the LVPD. Though Finn is initially reluctant to help Russell, she agrees to do so after laying down several "ground rules", namely: she likes to be called Finn, she does not want to talk about the past, and Russell and she need to adopt a safe word ("stop") to ensure his zen-talking does not irritate her. Russell later offers Finn a more permanent position as his assistant supervisor, a job she says she will consider, and later accepts. In "Stealing Home", Finn begins to build strong professional bonds with her colleagues, and also rebuilds her friendship with Russell. During the investigation into a murder at a home of disputed ownership, she threatens to cut the house in half using a chainsaw, much to the amusement of Sara Sidle. Russell later states that he hopes his optimistic outlook will not affect his friendship with Finn, as he is simply "better at hiding losing faith than she is" ("CSI: Unplugged"), the two later reconcile fully, with Finn spending a lot of time in Russell's office, often sitting in his chair ("Trends with Benefits"). She is also instrumental in the CSI's decision to "go old-school" (using ABO typing to identify a suspect) in "CSI: Unplugged", demonstrating her wide-ranging forensic abilities. She is later shown to take candid photographs at crime scenes, to preserve evidence of crowds ("Trends with Benefits"). 

In "Trends with Benefits", Charlie Russell states that Finn was a "drag" the last time she worked with his father, though Russell believes that this time will be different. She is also shown to be extremely comfortable in D.B.'s house, rifling his fridge for food. In "Malice in Wonderland", Finn states that she hates weddings as her feet hurt when wearing expensive footwear, though she later attends a wedding ceremony and returns evidence to the victim's husband, demonstrating her sentimental tendencies for the first time. Season 12 also reveals that antibody profiling is Finn's specialty ("Split Decisions"), and she is not afraid to embrace her sexuality ("Altered Stakes"). In "Altered Stakes", Russell makes Finn attend a baseball game for "the team", in which she pretends to have a stitch to flirt with Detective Carlos Moreno on third base. The two appear to be in a sexual relationship by the following episode, "Dune and Gloom". Later, she is instrumental in the reopening of a case involving evidence improperly processed by Grissom.

Finn reveals she has watched The Lord of the Rings 40 times, and wants to watch Athrock the Conqueror, a recently released medieval film ("Dune and Gloom"). She is also a fan of The Three Musketeers, though struggles to correct Morgan's omission of D'Artagnan in an analogy, as she does not wish to sound like D.B. In "Homecoming", Finn aggressively pursues a suspect, forcing Russell and Sheriff Liston to remind her of her previous conduct in Seattle - much to Finn's annoyance, who believes Russell is always a politician. Russell later notes that he did not think she did anything wrong in Seattle, though he does believe she has plans for Moreno. She later goes on a date with Officer Crenshaw following an argument with Moreno. It is revealed to the audience that Crenshaw is an employee of Jeffrey McKeen, and he states he has "eyes on the package" - he plans to kidnap Finlay as part of a decapitation strategy that sees Ecklie gunned down while walking with Morgan and Russell's abducted granddaughter ("Homecoming").

Season 13 
The 13th season begins with Finlay telling Crenshaw she intends to find out what he is planning. He later lures her to a bar where Russell's granddaughter is being held captive. Crenshaw locks Finn up with Kaitlyn, though she takes the opportunity to release the kidnapped girl, and engages in a fight with her captors. Moreno later rescues Finn, while Finn's efforts to disrupt McKeen's plans are pivotal to the safe retrieval of both Katie and herself, much to the relief of D.B. ("Karma to Burn"), though he fails to inform her of his marital difficulties in the following episode ("Code Blue Plate Special"). The two are confidantes once again in "It Was A Very Good Year", however, with Finn inquiring as to Barbara Russell's emotional state. "Code Blue Plate Special" also sees Finn exercise an ability to disperse CSIs from a crime scene for the first time, noting that she needs the whole area to herself, much to the annoyance of Nick Stokes. In "Wild Flowers"; however,  Stokes and she are shown to be close once again with him warning Moreno not to play games with Finn, while Moreno states she is "hot and cold". After regaining her friendships with Nick and D.B., Finn becomes close to both Morgan, who confides in Finn about her personal life ("Play Dead"), and Sara, who shares with her her emotional anguish over the death of Warrick Brown ("Fallen Angels"). Finn's professional integrity is cemented in "Pick and Roll", when she warns D.B. to desist with his unethical behavior, when he attempts to illegally seize evidence to solidify a case.

The first insight into Finn's personal and professional lives is given in "CSI on Fire", in which D.B. and she fight the FBI for a crime scene, eventually attaining jurisdiction. One of the bodies is revealed to be a victim who is part of the case in which Finn resigned from the Seattle P.D. Finn travels to Seattle, where she reconciles with her ex-husband, smashing his TV before noting that she paid for it. The CSI's prime suspect is later found dead shortly after Finn entered his hotel room with a gun, leading to her being dismissed from the case by both Jim Brass and Al Robbins. The case is later solved, with Finn stating it has taken her "two years, two jobs, one marriage", but she has finally caught him. She then returns to Vegas in time to support in an investigation into the discovery of a severed head ("Strip Maul"), and support Sara in her marital difficulties ("Risky Business Class"). Finn later re-enacts a murder at a news station alongside the rest of the team, appearing surprised when the young weather forecaster actually possesses meteorological knowledge ("Dead Air").

During this season, Finn is also revealed to have played tennis as a child, and engages in a match with Chris Evert during a murder investigation ("Double Fault"). She later supervises the processing of text messages sent to and from CSI: NY's Mac Taylor's girlfriend Christine's phone as part of a kidnapping investigation, describing them as "flirtatious" ("In Vino Veritas"), and bonds with Robbins over his taste in music ("Exile"). In "Forget Me Not", Finlay processes Sara when she is accused of homicide, inquiring as to whether her colleagues are "team Grissom or team Sara", in lieu of their separation. She also demonstrates at least some understanding of playing cards in "Last Woman Standing", noting the significance of the weapons depicted thereon. Though Finn notes she has demons from her high school days, she chooses not to dwell on the past, and instead to grow up and move on ("Dead of the Class"). This is a trait she shares with Greg Sanders. In "Sheltered", Finn once again demonstrates an affinity for the victim, choosing to go to the hospital instead of processing the crime scene, and in "Ghosts of the Past", she bonds with a former kidnapping victim, though she returns to processing blood evidence in the intermediate episodes ("Backfire" and "Fearless"). During the season finale, Finn plays a key role in convincing Ecklie to send Morgan undercover, which results in the latter being kidnapped ("Skin in the Game").

Season 14 
In the Season 14 premiere, "The Devil and D.B. Russell", Finn's audio/visual analysis proves quite valuable in locating kidnapped CSI Morgan Brody.

In "Torch Song", Finn is impressed by Nick Stokes and his knowledge of arson investigation as the two probe a nightclub fire that resulted in the deaths of four people.

In "Girls Gone Wild", while accompanying Sara Sidle and Morgan Brody on a car trip that leaves them stranded in a rural Nevada town, Finn is assaulted and nearly raped by a shady mechanic who previously assisted the three women with their car trouble.  She stabs the man with his own knife in self-defense, initially leaving him for dead. After informing Sara and Morgan of what happened, the three return to the site of the attack, only to find the mechanic missing.  These events arouse the suspicions of the chauvinistic local sheriff, though the subsequent investigation eventually clears Finn of any wrongdoing.

Season 15 
During the season-15 premiere, Russell and Finlay are called to a crime scene in which all the evidence has been processed, much in the manner of a serial killer they hunted in Seattle. Though Finn originally thinks it may be the work of a copycat, her old colleague and recent love interest, Daniel Shaw, confirms that his partner has gone missing, and it may be the work of the Gig Harbor killer - whom D.B. and Finn supposedly apprehended in Seattle. As Finlay questions whether the original killer had a partner, she finds herself trapped inside a car rigged to explode. As the bomb squad fail to render the device inactive, D.B. receives a phone call from an anonymous suspect claiming to be the original Gig Harbor killer. He releases Finn in exchange for the reopening of the investigation into his crimes ("The CSI Effect"). As Russell and she continue to work on the investigation, they discover that their original suspect has an identical twin brother, though Finn stresses the importance of finding evidence of them meeting before the murders ("Buzz Kill"). Though Finn continues to work on other cases throughout the season, such as a suspected release of the Ebola virus ("Bad Blood"), the death of a man in a doll suit ("Rubbery Homicide"), a riot at a prison ("Let's Make a Deal"), the murder of a party girl ("Road to Recovery"), and the death of a chemistry teacher ("The Book of Shadows"), she remains wholly preoccupied with catching the Gig Harbor killer. "Girls Gone Wilder" has Finn accompany Sara and Morgan to a forensics conference when a shooting occurs. Though she was absent from the theater where the massacre took place, the killer tried to shoot Finn in an elevator as she was leaving a hotel room with a former lover; he is injured in the process, leaving Finn to tend to his wounds - successfully. She then contemplates embarking on a serious relationship with the criminalist.

Finn's hunt for the Gig Harbor killer continues in "The Twin Paradox", in which she concludes that Briscoe likely knew about Winthrop's existence earlier than he claims. She tracks the killer to an old warehouse, and leads a tactical team on entry, though he has already gone. Finn is later forced to shoot and kill one of the killer's hostages after she attacks Greg with a gun. Though DNA suggests the woman Finn killed is the murderer, Russell and she believe otherwise. In "Dead Rails", Finn is shown instructing Morgan on the analysis of blood spatter patterns, exploring her teaching role within the team. In the same episode, she also helps to build a case when a friend of Catherine Willows's father is found dead. She works on reconstructing broken glass in "Angle of Attack", and later works closely with Nick.

In the Season 15 finale, "The End Game", Finn, Russell, and the team continue their investigation into the Briscoe/Winthrop twins and "The Gig Harbor Killer" case.  During the investigation, Finn and Russell decide to head to Seattle to find the twins' birth mother.  Finn goes to her apartment to pack her bags. There, she is surprised by Paul Winthrop, who is masquerading as his deceased twin brother, Jared Briscoe.  He beats her severely before placing her in the trunk of a car and staging a mock crime scene in the apartment to taunt Russell.  Finn is soon found by Russell and the team and is taken to a hospital, where it's determined she is comatose indefinitely.  She remains in a coma up to the point where Russell departs Las Vegas to work for the FBI's Cyber Division.

Immortality 
Following her attack during season 15, Finn is revealed to have died ("Immortality"). As D.B. is packing up his office, he places a plaque in a box commemorating Finlay. This indicates that she never regained consciousness after February 15, 2015. Russell states that everything in his heart is now in that box, and he intends for Finn to head East with him, stating, "ah Jules, wherever I go, you go."

CSI: Cyber

Season 2 
Finlay's relationship with Russell is central to "Hack E.R.", as Russell investigates a case in a hospital. He reveals to Ryan that, shortly before Finn was attacked, he loaned her a copy of a crime novel titled The Thin Man. He spent several months in a hospital room reading this book to her, in the hope that, as he concluded the final chapter, she would wake up. She died before he finished reading it. Russell later continues reading the book, saying "Goodbye, Jules", as he completes the final chapter. Avery likens Finlay to Nora, while comparing Russell to Nick – the married protagonists of the novel. Elisabeth Shue appears in archive footage.

Succession 
Finlay succeeded Catherine Willows as the CSI Grave Shift Assistant Supervisor, a role she held onscreen from "Stealing Home" to "The End Game". She was not replaced following her death.

References

External links
IMDb Character Profile

CSI: Crime Scene Investigation characters
Fictional forensic scientists
Television characters introduced in 2012
Fictional Seattle Police Department detectives